Harold Hylton (born 1960) is a retired two time British Amateur Heavyweight Championboxer.

Boxing career
1982 ABA Heavyweight Champion, 1983 ABA Heavyweight Finalist, 1985 ABA Heavyweight Champion, 1988 ABA Heavyweight Finalist.
He represented England and won a silver medal in the 91 kg heavyweight division, at the 1982 Commonwealth Games in Brisbane, Queensland, Australia.

Hylton boxed for the Brockworth Viking ABC in Coney Hill Gloucester and was twice the ABA heavyweight champion in 1982 and 1985. Also, he was a twice beaten finalist in 1983 and 1988.

References

1960 births
Living people
British male boxers
Commonwealth Games medallists in boxing
Boxers at the 1982 Commonwealth Games
Commonwealth Games silver medallists for England
Heavyweight boxers
Medallists at the 1982 Commonwealth Games